The 1994 Kerry Senior Football Championship was the 94th staging of the Kerry Senior Football Championship since its establishment by the Kerry County Board in 1889. The championship ran from 1 July to 23 October 1994.

Laune Rangers entered the championship as the defending champions, however, they were beaten by Dr. Crokes in the semi-finals.

The final was played on 23 October 1994 at Austin Stack Park in Tralee, between Austin Stacks and Dr. Crokes, in what was their first ever meeting in the final. Austin Stacks won the match by 0-12 to 1-05 to claim their 11th championship title overall and a first title in eight years.

Darren Aherne was the championship's top scorer with 1-22.

Results

Preliminary round

Round 1

Quarter-finals

Semi-finals

Final

Championship statistcs

Top scorers

Overall

In a single game

Miscellaneous
 Austin Stacks won a first title in eight years.
 Austin Stacks moved to the top of the roll of honor with 11 titles.
 Austin Stacks and Dr Crokes face each other in the final for the first time.
 The final goes to a re-play for the first time since 1987.

References

Kerry Senior Football Championship
1994 in Gaelic football